Rune Angell-Jacobsen (born December 16, 1947 Florø) is a Norwegian novelist.

He is a former lieutenant colonel in the Air Force, where he worked as a systems operator on P-3 Orion, and later as an intelligence officer.

Works
 SAS-fly kapret (SAS plane hijacked!)
 Døden er hvit (Death is white)
 Amerika! Series of 52
 Sara vakker Series of 22
 Abel Ek - En statsråds død (Abel Ek)
 Folket på Lindstad

References

1947 births
Living people
Norwegian crime fiction writers